Little Red Rodent Hood is a 1952 Warner Bros. Merrie Melodies animated short directed by Friz Freleng. The short was released on May 3, 1952, and stars Sylvester in a spoof of "Little Red Riding Hood".

Plot
A grandmother mouse is telling her granddaughter a bedtime story, and so tells of Little Red Riding Hood (with the mouse as Riding Hood), and her visit to Grandma's House, unaware that the wolf (Sylvester) is watching her. He takes a shortcut to Grandma's, only to find four others already there, who he forces out. Red comes along, and he speaks his cue line, "The better to eat you with," starting the chase.

He pursues Red down the staircase, only to be propelled further than intended by a small stick of butter. Sylvester then decides to blow the house up with dynamite, but accidentally sticks it into Hector's mouth, who then sticks it in the cat's mouth until it blows up.

Sylvester next disguises himself as Red's fairy godmother, attempting to electrocute him with a rigged wand. However, Hector unplugs the power so that it doesn't work. He then plugs it back in just as Sylvester tests it on himself.

The mouse then tries to go outside, but is trapped once again. Underneath a cup, Sylvester watches as the mouse prepares something, revealed to be a miniature tank that packs a punch. He then traps the mouse by its hole. The grandmother describes how, to save herself, the mouse threw a stick of dynamite out left from the Fourth of July, doing so to demonstrate. The mouse claims that it must have blown the cat up, to which Sylvester replies, "You're not just whistling 'Dixie', brother!"

Home media
 Laserdisc - Wince Upon a Time
 DVD - Looney Tunes Golden Collection: Volume 5
 Blu-ray & DVD - Looney Tunes Platinum Collection: Volume 2

See also
 List of cartoons featuring Sylvester

References

1952 animated films
1952 short films
Merrie Melodies short films
Warner Bros. Cartoons animated short films
American parody films
Fairy tale parody films
Films based on Little Red Riding Hood
Short films directed by Friz Freleng
1952 films
Animated films about cats
Animated films about mice
Animated films about dogs
Films scored by Carl Stalling
1950s Warner Bros. animated short films
1950s English-language films
Sylvester the Cat films